William Falconer (21 February 1732 – c. January 1770) was a Scottish epic poet concerned mainly with life at sea. He also compiled a dictionary of marine terms.

Life
Falconer was the son of a barber in Edinburgh, where he was born. He became a sailor, and thereby competent to describe the management of a storm-tossed vessel, whose career and fate are told in his poem, The Shipwreck (1762), a work of genuine, if unequal talent. The efforts Falconer made to improve the poem in a later edition were not wholly successful.

The work won him the patronage of the Duke of York, through whose influence he was appointed purser on various warships. He had himself been one of three survivors of a trading ship on a voyage from Alexandria to Venice.

In 1751 Falconer produced a poem on the death of Frederick, Prince of Wales. He had also contributed poems to the Gentleman's Magazine. The Shipwreck was dedicated to the then rear-admiral the Duke of York.

Falconer was briefly a midshipman on the Royal George, then in 1763 he became purser of the frigate Glory, aboard which he wrote the political satire Demagogue. In 1767 he was purser of the Swiftsure. In 1769 he published An Universal Dictionary of the Marine.

William Falconer was a passenger in the frigate Aurora when it was lost at sea on a voyage to India. He was last seen on 24 December 1769.

Later borrowings
Falconer's poems were used by Patrick O'Brian in his Aubrey-Maturin series. One of his lesser characters is a nautical poet, but his poems are Falconer's.

The lines "With living colours give my verse to glow:/The sad memorial of a tale of woe!", from The Shipwreck, Canto I, appeared as a motto for Tafereel van de overwintering der Hollanders op Nova Zembla in de jaren 1596 en 1597 (1820), by the Dutch poet Hendrik Tollens (1780–1856).

See also
 List of 18th-century British working-class writers
 List of people who disappeared mysteriously at sea

References

Sources
Gutenberg.org, The Poetical Works of Beattie, Blair and Falconer in Library Edition of the British Poets edited by the Rev. George Gilfillan

"William Falconer' in Oxford Dictionary of National Biography

External links

William Falconer at the Eighteenth-Century Poetry Archive (ECPA)
Biography
William Falconer's Dictionary of the Marine (National Library of Australia)

1732 births
1760s missing person cases
1769 deaths
Maritime writers
People lost at sea
Scottish poets
Shipwreck survivors
Royal Navy officers
Writers from Edinburgh